Alia Al-Saji is an Associate Professor of Philosophy at McGill University. Her work focuses on bringing 20th century phenomenology and French philosophy into dialogue with critical race and feminist theories. Al-Saji believes that feminist phenomenology must take an intersectional approach to its work, one that accounts for the fact that gender cannot be treated in a vacuum apart from other axes of oppression.

Education and career
Al-Saji received a bachelor's degree from McMaster University in 1993, a master's degree in Philosophy from KU Leuven in 1995, and a doctorate in Philosophy from Emory University in 2002. After receiving her doctorate, Al-Saji accepted a teaching position at McGill University, an institution she is still at. In her time at McGill (and previously, as a graduate student,) Al-Saji published a number of papers in peer-reviewed journals. She is also working on a manuscript, tentatively titled The Time of Difference: Thinking memory, perception and ethics with Bergson and Merleau-Ponty.

Al-Saji is the editor of the feminist philosophy section of the journal Philosophy Compass.  She is a co-editor of the Symposia on Gender, Race and Philosophy. Al-Saji has held a number of fellowships, including one at the Institute of Advanced Study at Durham University in 2012, where she carried out research related to the theme of time, and one at The Camargo Foundation in Cassis, France.

Research areas
Much of Al-Saji's work has represented an effort to forge links between 20th century phenomenology and French philosophy and critical race and feminist theories. A significant theme of her work has been the question of time. Al-Saji's research has two distinct tracks: the first looks at questions of embodiment, memory, and intersubjectivity, and the second attempts to develop a phenomenology of "cultural racism," especially through feminist analysis of the depiction of Muslim women in modern western contexts.  Al-Saji's work has touched upon the work of many scholars before her, including Henri Bergson, Edmund Husserl, Maurice Merleau-Ponty, Jean Paul Sartre, and many others, although her work has primarily focused on Bergson and Merleau-Ponty.

References

Living people
Feminist philosophers
Phenomenologists
American women philosophers
Year of birth missing (living people)
Academic staff of McGill University
McMaster University alumni
Emory University alumni
Fellows of the Institute of Advanced Study (Durham)
21st-century American women